The canton of Treffort-Cuisiat is a former administrative division in eastern France. It was disbanded following the French canton reorganisation which came into effect in March 2015. It consisted of 9 communes, which joined the new canton of Saint-Étienne-du-Bois in 2015. It had 8,281 inhabitants (2012).

The canton comprised 9 communes:

Chavannes-sur-Suran
Corveissiat
Courmangoux
Germagnat
Meillonnas
Pouillat
Pressiat
Saint-Étienne-du-Bois
Treffort-Cuisiat

Demographics

See also
Cantons of the Ain department

References

Former cantons of Ain
2015 disestablishments in France
States and territories disestablished in 2015